Saeid Maragehchian  is an Iranian football player who took part for Iran in the 1984 Asian Cup, without playing any game.

Honours 

Asian Cup:
Fourth Place : 1984

External links
Stats

Living people
Iranian footballers
Esteghlal F.C. players
Year of birth missing (living people)
Place of birth missing (living people)
Association footballers not categorized by position